Artificial general intelligence (AGI) is the ability of an intelligent agent to understand or learn any intellectual task that human beings or other animals can.
It is a primary goal of some artificial intelligence research and a common topic in science fiction and futures studies. AGI is also called strong AI, full AI, or general intelligent action, although some academic sources reserve the term "strong AI" for computer programs that experience sentience or consciousness.

Strong AI contrasts with weak AI (or narrow AI), which is not intended to have general cognitive abilities; rather, weak AI is any program that is designed to solve exactly one problem. (Academic sources reserve "weak AI" for programs that do not experience consciousness or do not have a mind in the same sense people do.)

A 2020 survey identified 72 active AGI R&D projects spread across 37 countries.

Characteristics

Various criteria for intelligence have been proposed (most famously the Turing test) but to date, there is no definition that satisfies everyone.

Intelligence traits 
However, there is wide agreement among artificial intelligence researchers that intelligence is required to do the following: 
 reason, use strategy, solve puzzles, and make judgments under uncertainty; 
 represent knowledge, including common sense knowledge; 
 plan; 
 learn; 
 communicate in natural language; 
and integrate all these skills towards common goals. Other important capabilities include:
 input as the ability to sense (e.g. see, hear, etc.), and 
 output as the ability to act (e.g. move and manipulate objects, change own location to explore, etc.) 
in this world where intelligent behaviour is to be observed. This would include an ability to detect and respond to hazard. Many interdisciplinary approaches to intelligence (e.g. cognitive science, computational intelligence and decision making) tend to emphasise the need to consider additional traits such as imagination (taken as the ability to form mental images and concepts that were not programmed in) and autonomy.

Computer based systems that exhibit many of these capabilities do exist (e.g. see computational creativity, automated reasoning, decision support system, robot, evolutionary computation, intelligent agent), but no one has created an integrated system that excels at all these areas.

Mathematical formalisms 
A mathematically precise specification of AGI was proposed by Marcus Hutter in 2000. Named AIXI, the proposed agent maximises “the ability to satisfy goals in a wide range of environments”. This type of AGI, characterized by proof of the ability to maximise a mathematical definition of intelligence rather than exhibit human-like behaviour, is also called universal artificial intelligence. 

In 2015 Jan Lieke and Marcus Hutter showed that "Legg-Hutter intelligence is measured with respect to a fixed Universal Turing Machine (UTM). AIXI is the most intelligent policy if it uses the same UTM", a result which "undermines all existing optimality properties for AIXI". This problem stems from AIXI's use of compression as a proxy for intelligence, which requires that cognition take place in isolation from the environment in which goals are pursued. This formalises a philosophical position known as Mind–body dualism. There is arguably more evidence in support of enactivism -- the notion that cognition takes place within the environment in which goals are pursued. Subsequently, Michael Timothy Bennett formalised enactive cognition (see enactivism) and identified an alternative proxy for intelligence called weakness . The accompanying experiments (comparing weakness and compression) and mathematical proofs showed that maximising weakness results in the optimal "ability to complete a wide range of tasks"  or equivalently "ability to generalise"  (thus maximising intelligence by either definition). This also showed that if enactivism holds and Mind–body dualism does not, then compression is not necessary or sufficient for intelligence, calling into question widely held views on intelligence (see also Hutter Prize).

Regardless of the position taken with respect to cognition, whether this type of AGI exhibits human-like behaviour (such as the use of natural language) would depend on many factors, for example the manner in which the agent is embodied, or whether it has a reward function that closely approximates human primitives of cognition like hunger, pain and so forth.

Tests for testing human-level AGI
The following tests to confirm human-level AGI have been considered:
The Turing Test (Turing)
 A machine and a human both converse unseen with a second human, who must evaluate which of the two is the machine, which passes the test if it can fool the evaluator a significant fraction of the time. Note: Turing does not prescribe what should qualify as intelligence, only that knowing that it is a machine should disqualify it.
The Coffee Test (Wozniak)
 A machine is required to enter an average American home and figure out how to make coffee: find the coffee machine, find the coffee, add water, find a mug, and brew the coffee by pushing the proper buttons.
The Robot College Student Test (Goertzel)
 A machine enrolls in a university, taking and passing the same classes that humans would, and obtaining a degree.
The Employment Test (Nilsson)
 A machine performs an economically important job at least as well as humans in the same job.

AI-complete problems

There are many individual problems that may require general intelligence, if machines are to solve the problems as well as people do. For example, even specific straightforward tasks, like machine translation, require that a machine read and write in both languages (NLP), follow the author's argument (reason), know what is being talked about (knowledge), and faithfully reproduce the author's original intent (social intelligence). All of these problems need to be solved simultaneously in order to reach human-level machine performance.

A problem is informally known as "AI-complete" or "AI-hard", if solving it is equivalent to the general aptitude of human intelligence, or strong AI, and is beyond the capabilities of a purpose-specific algorithm.

AI-complete problems are hypothesised to include general computer vision, natural language understanding, and dealing with unexpected circumstances while solving any real-world problem.

AI-complete problems cannot be solved with current computer technology alone, and require human computation. This property could be useful, for example, to test for the presence of humans, as CAPTCHAs aim to do; and for computer security to repel brute-force attacks.

History

Classical AI

Modern AI research began in the mid-1950s. The first generation of AI researchers were convinced that artificial general intelligence was possible and that it would exist in just a few decades. AI pioneer Herbert A. Simon wrote in 1965: "machines will be capable, within twenty years, of doing any work a man can do." Their predictions were the inspiration for Stanley Kubrick and Arthur C. Clarke's character HAL 9000, who embodied what AI researchers believed they could create by the year 2001. AI pioneer Marvin Minsky was a consultant on the project of making HAL 9000 as realistic as possible according to the consensus predictions of the time; Crevier quotes him as having said on the subject in 1967, "Within a generation ... the problem of creating 'artificial intelligence' will substantially be solved".

Several classical AI projects, such as Doug Lenat's Cyc project (that began in 1984), and Allen Newell's Soar project, were specifically directed at AGI.

However, in the early 1970s and then again in the early 90s, it became obvious that researchers had grossly underestimated the difficulty of the project. Funding agencies became skeptical of AGI and put researchers under increasing pressure to produce useful "applied AI". As the 1980s began, Japan's Fifth Generation Computer Project revived interest in AGI, setting out a ten-year timeline that included AGI goals like "carry on a casual conversation". In response to this and the success of expert systems, both industry and government pumped money back into the field. However, confidence in AI spectacularly collapsed in the late 1980s, and the goals of the Fifth Generation Computer Project were never fulfilled. For the second time in 20 years, AI researchers who had predicted the imminent achievement of AGI had been shown to be fundamentally mistaken. By the 1990s, AI researchers had gained a reputation for making vain promises. They became reluctant to make predictions at all and to avoid any mention of "human level" artificial intelligence for fear of being labeled "wild-eyed dreamer[s]".

Narrow AI research

In the 1990s and early 21st century, mainstream AI achieved far greater commercial success and academic respectability by focusing on specific sub-problems where they can produce verifiable results and commercial applications, such as artificial neural networks and statistical machine learning. These "applied AI" systems are now used extensively throughout the technology industry, and research in this vein is heavily funded in both academia and industry. Currently, development on this field is considered an emerging trend, and a mature stage is expected to happen in more than 10 years.

Most mainstream AI researchers hope that strong AI can be developed by combining the programs that solve various sub-problems. Hans Moravec wrote in 1988: I am confident that this bottom-up route to artificial intelligence will one day meet the traditional top-down route more than half way, ready to provide the real world competence and the commonsense knowledge that has been so frustratingly elusive in reasoning programs. Fully intelligent machines will result when the metaphorical golden spike is driven uniting the two efforts.

However, even this fundamental philosophy has been disputed; for example, Stevan Harnad of Princeton University concluded his 1990 paper on the Symbol Grounding Hypothesis by stating: The expectation has often been voiced that "top-down" (symbolic) approaches to modeling cognition will somehow meet "bottom-up" (sensory) approaches somewhere in between. If the grounding considerations in this paper are valid, then this expectation is hopelessly modular and there is really only one viable route from sense to symbols: from the ground up. A free-floating symbolic level like the software level of a computer will never be reached by this route (or vice versa) – nor is it clear why we should even try to reach such a level, since it looks as if getting there would just amount to uprooting our symbols from their intrinsic meanings (thereby merely reducing ourselves to the functional equivalent of a programmable computer).

Modern artificial general intelligence research
The term "artificial general intelligence" was used as early as 1997, by Mark Gubrud in a discussion of the implications of fully automated military production and operations. The term was re-introduced and popularized by Shane Legg and Ben Goertzel around 2002. AGI research activity in 2006 was described by Pei Wang and Ben Goertzel as "producing publications and preliminary results". The first summer school in AGI was organized in Xiamen, China in 2009 by the Xiamen university's Artificial Brain Laboratory and OpenCog. The first university course was given in 2010 and 2011 at Plovdiv University, Bulgaria by Todor Arnaudov. MIT presented a course in AGI in 2018, organized by Lex Fridman and featuring a number of guest lecturers.

However, as of yet, most AI researchers have devoted little attention to AGI, with some claiming that intelligence is too complex to be completely replicated in the near term. However, a small number of computer scientists are active in AGI research, and many of this group are contributing to a series of AGI conferences. The research is extremely diverse and often pioneering in nature.

Timescales: In the introduction to his 2006 book, Goertzel says that estimates of the time needed before a truly flexible AGI is built vary from 10 years to over a century, but the 2007 consensus in the AGI research community seems to be that the timeline discussed by Ray Kurzweil in The Singularity is Near (i.e. between 2015 and 2045) is plausible. However, mainstream AI researchers have given a wide range of opinions on whether progress will be this rapid. A 2012 meta-analysis of 95 such opinions found a bias towards predicting that the onset of AGI would occur within 16–26 years for modern and historical predictions alike. It was later found that the dataset listed some experts as non-experts and vice versa.

In 2017, researchers Feng Liu, Yong Shi and Ying Liu conducted intelligence tests on publicly available and freely accessible weak AI such as Google AI or Apple's Siri and others. At the maximum, these AI reached an IQ value of about 47, which corresponds approximately to a six-year-old child in first grade. An adult comes to about 100 on average. Similar tests had been carried out in 2014, with the IQ score reaching a maximum value of 27.

In 2020, OpenAI developed GPT-3, a language model capable of performing many diverse tasks without specific training. According to Gary Grossman in a VentureBeat article, while there is consensus that GPT-3 is not an example of AGI, it is considered by some to be too advanced to classify as a narrow AI system.

In the same year Jason Rohrer used his GPT-3 account to develop a chatbot, and provided a chatbot-developing platform called "Project December". OpenAI asked for changes to the chatbot to comply with their safety guidelines; Rohrer disconnected Project December from the GPT-3 API.

In 2022, DeepMind developed Gato, a "general-purpose" system capable of performing more than 600 different tasks.

Brain simulation

Whole brain emulation

A popular discussed approach to achieving general intelligent action is whole brain emulation. A low-level brain model is built by scanning and mapping a biological brain in detail and copying its state into a computer system or another computational device. The computer runs a simulation model so faithful to the original that it will behave in essentially the same way as the original brain, or for all practical purposes, indistinguishably. Whole brain emulation is discussed in computational neuroscience and neuroinformatics, in the context of brain simulation for medical research purposes. It is discussed in artificial intelligence research as an approach to strong AI. Neuroimaging technologies that could deliver the necessary detailed understanding are improving rapidly, and futurist Ray Kurzweil in the book The Singularity Is Near predicts that a map of sufficient quality will become available on a similar timescale to the required computing power.

Early estimates
 For low-level brain simulation, an extremely powerful computer would be required. The human brain has a huge number of synapses. Each of the 1011 (one hundred billion) neurons has on average 7,000 synaptic connections (synapses) to other neurons. It has been estimated that the brain of a three-year-old child has about 1015 synapses (1 quadrillion). This number declines with age, stabilizing by adulthood. Estimates vary for an adult, ranging from 1014 to 5×1014 synapses (100 to 500 trillion). An estimate of the brain's processing power, based on a simple switch model for neuron activity, is around 1014 (100 trillion) synaptic updates per second (SUPS). 

In 1997, Kurzweil looked at various estimates for the hardware required to equal the human brain and adopted a figure of 1016 computations per second (cps). (For comparison, if a "computation" was equivalent to one "floating-point operation" – a measure used to rate current supercomputers – then 1016 "computations" would be equivalent to 10 petaFLOPS, achieved in 2011, while 1018 was achieved in 2022.) He used this figure to predict the necessary hardware would be available sometime between 2015 and 2025, if the exponential growth in computer power at the time of writing continued.

Modelling the neurons in more detail
The artificial neuron model assumed by Kurzweil and used in many current artificial neural network implementations is simple compared with biological neurons. A brain simulation would likely have to capture the detailed cellular behaviour of biological neurons, presently understood only in the broadest of outlines. The overhead introduced by full modeling of the biological, chemical, and physical details of neural behaviour (especially on a molecular scale) would require computational powers several orders of magnitude larger than Kurzweil's estimate. In addition, the estimates do not account for glial cells, which are known to play a role in cognitive processes.

Current research
There are some research projects that are investigating brain simulation using more sophisticated neural models, implemented on conventional computing architectures. The Artificial Intelligence System project implemented non-real time simulations of a "brain" (with 1011 neurons) in 2005. It took 50 days on a cluster of 27 processors to simulate 1 second of a model. The Blue Brain project used one of the fastest supercomputer architectures in the world, IBM's Blue Gene platform, to create a real time simulation of a single rat neocortical column consisting of approximately 10,000 neurons and 108 synapses in 2006. A longer-term goal is to build a detailed, functional simulation of the physiological processes in the human brain: "It is not impossible to build a human brain and we can do it in 10 years," Henry Markram, director of the Blue Brain Project said in 2009 at the TED conference in Oxford. There have also been controversial claims to have simulated a cat brain. Neuro-silicon interfaces have been proposed as an alternative implementation strategy that may scale better.

Hans Moravec addressed the above arguments ("brains are more complicated", "neurons have to be modeled in more detail") in his 1997 paper "When will computer hardware match the human brain?". He measured the ability of existing software to simulate the functionality of neural tissue, specifically the retina. His results do not depend on the number of glial cells, nor on what kinds of processing neurons perform where.

The actual complexity of modeling biological neurons has been explored in OpenWorm project that was aimed on complete simulation of a worm that has only 302 neurons in its neural network (among about 1000 cells in total). The animal's neural network has been well documented before the start of the project. However, although the task seemed simple at the beginning, the models based on a generic neural network did not work. Currently, the efforts are focused on precise emulation of biological neurons (partly on the molecular level), but the result cannot yet be called a total success.

Criticisms of simulation-based approaches
A fundamental criticism of the simulated brain approach derives from embodied cognition where human embodiment is taken as an essential aspect of human intelligence. Many researchers believe that embodiment is necessary to ground meaning. If this view is correct, any fully functional brain model will need to encompass more than just the neurons (i.e., a robotic body). Goertzel proposes virtual embodiment (like in Second Life), but it is not yet known whether this would be sufficient.

Desktop computers using microprocessors capable of more than 109 cps (Kurzweil's non-standard unit "computations per second", see above) have been available since 2005. According to the brain power estimates used by Kurzweil (and Moravec), this computer should be capable of supporting a simulation of a bee brain, but despite some interest no such simulation exists. There are several reasons for this:
The neuron model seems to be oversimplified (see next section).
There is insufficient understanding of higher cognitive processes to establish accurately what the brain's neural activity (observed using techniques such as functional magnetic resonance imaging) correlates with.
Even if our understanding of cognition advances sufficiently, early simulation programs are likely to be very inefficient and will, therefore, need considerably more hardware.
The brain of an organism, while critical, may not be an appropriate boundary for a cognitive model. To simulate a bee brain, it may be necessary to simulate the body, and the environment. The Extended Mind thesis formalises the philosophical concept, and research into cephalopods has demonstrated clear examples of a decentralized system.

In addition, the scale of the human brain is not currently well-constrained. One estimate puts the human brain at about 100 billion neurons and 100 trillion synapses. Another estimate is 86 billion neurons of which 16.3 billion are in the cerebral cortex and 69 billion in the cerebellum. Glial cell synapses are currently unquantified but are known to be extremely numerous.

Philosophical perspective

"Strong AI" as defined in philosophy
In 1980, philosopher John Searle coined the term "strong AI" as part of his Chinese room argument. He wanted to distinguish between two different hypotheses about artificial intelligence:
 Strong AI hypothesis: An artificial intelligence system can "think", have "a mind" and "consciousness".
 Weak AI hypothesis: An artificial intelligence system can (only) act like it thinks and has a mind and consciousness.
The first one he called "strong" because it makes a stronger statement: it assumes something special has happened to the machine that goes beyond all its abilities that we can test – the behaviour of a "weak AI" machine would be precisely identical to a "strong AI" machine, but the latter would also have subjective conscious experience. This usage is also common in academic AI research and textbooks.

Mainstream AI is only interested in how a program behaves. According to Russell and Norvig, "as long as the program works, they don't care if you call it real or a simulation." If the program can behave as if it has a mind, then there is no need to know if it actually has mind – indeed, there would be no way to tell. For AI research, Searle's "weak AI hypothesis" is equivalent to the statement "artificial general intelligence is possible". Thus, according to Russell and Norvig, "most AI researchers take the weak AI hypothesis for granted, and don't care about the strong AI hypothesis." Thus, for academic AI research, "Strong AI" and "AGI" are two very different things.

In contrast to Searle and mainstream AI, some futurists such as Ray Kurzweil use the term "strong AI" to mean "human level artificial general intelligence". This is not the same as Searle's strong AI, unless you assume that consciousness is necessary for human-level AGI. Academic philosophers such as Searle do not believe that is the case, and artificial intelligence researchers do not care.

Consciousness
There are other aspects of the human mind besides intelligence that are relevant to the concept of strong AI which play a major role in science fiction and the ethics of artificial intelligence:
 consciousness: To have subjective experience and thought.
 self-awareness: To be aware of oneself as a separate individual, especially to be aware of one's own thoughts.
 sentience: The ability to "feel" perceptions or emotions subjectively.
 sapience: The capacity for wisdom.

These traits have a moral dimension, because a machine with this form of strong AI may have rights, analogous to the rights of non-human animals. As such, preliminary work has been conducted on approaches to integrating full ethical agents with existing legal and social frameworks. These approaches have focused on the legal position and rights of 'strong' AI. Bill Joy, among others, argues a machine with these traits may be a threat to human life or dignity.

It remains to be shown whether any of these traits are necessary for strong AI. The role of consciousness is not clear, and there is no agreed test for its presence. If a machine is built with a device that simulates the neural correlates of consciousness, would it automatically have self-awareness? It is also possible that some of these properties, such as sentience, naturally emerge from a fully intelligent machine. It is also possible that it will become natural to ascribe these properties to machines once they begin to act in a way that is clearly intelligent.

Artificial consciousness research

Although the role of consciousness in strong AI/AGI is debatable, many AGI researchers regard research that investigates possibilities for implementing consciousness as vital. In an early effort Igor Aleksander argued that the principles for creating a conscious machine already existed but that it would take forty years to train such a machine to understand language.

Possible explanations for the slow progress of strong AI research

Since the launch of AI research in 1956, progress in this field of creating machines skilled with intelligent action at the human level has slowed. One basic potential explanation for this delay is that computers lack a sufficient scope of memory, processing power, or chip flexibility to accommodate computer-science-oriented and/or neuroscience-oriented platforms. In addition, the level of complexity involved in AI research likely also limits the progress of strong AI research.

Conceptual limitations are another possible reason for the slowness in AI research. AI researchers may need to modify the conceptual framework of their discipline in order to provide a stronger base and contribution to the quest of achieving strong AI. This means situating a strong AI in a sociocultural context where human-like AI derives from human-like experiences. As William Clocksin wrote in 2003: "the framework starts from Weizenbaum's observation that intelligence manifests itself only relative to specific social and cultural contexts".

A fundamental paradox arising from this problem is that AI researchers have only been able to create computers that can perform jobs that are complicated for people to do, such as mathematics, but conversely they have struggled to develop a computer that is capable of carrying out tasks that are simple for humans to do, such as walking (Moravec's paradox). The problem as described by David Gelernter is that some people assume thinking and reasoning are equivalent. The idea of whether thoughts and the creator of those thoughts are isolated individually or must be socially situated has intrigued AI researchers.

The problems encountered in AI research over the past decades have further impeded the progress of AGI research and development through generating a degree of distrust in the field. The failed predictions of success promised by AI researchers and the lack of a complete understanding of human behaviours have helped diminish optimism in the primary idea of creating human-level AI. Although the waxing and waning progress of AI research has brought both improvement and disappointment, most investigators are optimistic about achieving the goal of AGI in the 21st century.

Other possible reasons have been proposed for the slow progress towards strong AI. The intricacy of scientific problems and the need to fully understand the human brain through psychology and neurophysiology have limited many researchers in the task of emulating the function of the human brain in computer hardware through initiatives like the Human Brain Project. Many researchers tend to underestimate any doubt that is involved with future predictions of AI, but without taking issues like human brain modelling seriously, AGI researchers then overlook solutions to problematic questions.

However, Clocksin states that a conceptual limitation that may impede the progress of AI research is that AI researchers may be using the wrong techniques for computer programs and for the implementation of equipment. When AI researchers first began to aim for AGI, a main interest was to emulate and investigate human reasoning. At the time, researchers hoped to establish computational models of human knowledge through reasoning and to find out how to design a computer with a specific cognitive task.

In response, the practice of abstraction, which people tend to redefine when working with a particular context in research, provides AI researchers with the option to concentrate on just a few concepts. The most productive use of abstraction in AI research comes from planning and problem solving. Although the aim is to increase the speed of a computation, the role of abstraction operators has posed problems.

Another possible reason for the slowness in strong AI progress relates to the acknowledgement by many AI researchers that human heuristics is still vastly superior to computer performance. Nonetheless, the specific functions that are programmed into increasingly powerful computers may be able to account for many of the requirements in heuristics that eventually allow AI to match human intelligence. Thus, while heuristics is not necessarily a fundamental barrier to achieving strong AI, it is widely agreed to be a challenge.

Finally, many AI researchers have debated whether or not machines should be created with emotions. There are no emotions in typical models of AI, and some researchers say programming emotions into machines allows them to have a mind of their own. However, emotion sums up the experiences of humans because it allows them to remember those experiences. David Gelernter writes, "No computer will be creative unless it can simulate all the nuances of human emotion." Thus, just as this concern over emotion has posed problems for AI researchers, it is likely to continue to challenge the concept of strong AI as its research progresses.

Controversies and dangers

Feasibility
As of 2022, AGI remains speculative as no such system has yet been demonstrated. Opinions vary both on whether and when artificial general intelligence will arrive. At one extreme, AI pioneer Herbert A. Simon speculated in 1965 that "machines will be capable, within twenty years, of doing any work a man can do". However, this prediction failed to come true. Microsoft co-founder Paul Allen believed that such intelligence is unlikely in the 21st century because it would require "unforeseeable and fundamentally unpredictable breakthroughs" and a "scientifically deep understanding of cognition". Writing in The Guardian, roboticist Alan Winfield claimed the gulf between modern computing and human-level artificial intelligence is as wide as the gulf between current space flight and practical faster-than-light spaceflight.

As such, the basic concern is whether or not strong AI is fundamentally achievable, even after centuries of effort. While most AI researchers believe strong AI can be achieved in the future, some individuals, like Hubert Dreyfus and Roger Penrose, deny the possibility of achieving strong AI. One fundamental problem is that while humans are complex, they are not general intelligences. Various computer scientists, like John McCarthy, believe human-level AI will be accomplished, but that the present level of progress is such that a date cannot accurately be predicted. AI experts' views on the feasibility of AGI wax and wane, and may have seen a resurgence in the 2010s. Four polls conducted in 2012 and 2013 suggested that the median guess among experts for when they would be 50% confident AGI would arrive was 2040 to 2050, depending on the poll, with the mean being 2081. Of the experts, 16.5% answered with "never" when asked the same question but with a 90% confidence instead. Further current AGI progress considerations can be found above Tests for confirming human-level AGI.

Yet it is worth noting that there is no scientific rigour in such predictions. Rodney Brooks notes the findings of a report by Stuart Armstrong and Kaj Sotala, of the Machine Intelligence Research Institute, that "over that 60 year time frame there is a strong bias towards predicting the arrival of human level AI as between 15 and 25 years from the time the prediction was made". They also analyzed 95 predictions made between 1950 and the present on when human level AI will come about. They show that there is no difference between predictions made by experts and non-experts.

Potential threat to human existence

The thesis that AI poses an existential risk for humans, and that this risk needs much more attention than it currently gets, has been endorsed by many public figures; perhaps the most famous are Elon Musk, Bill Gates, and Stephen Hawking. The most notable AI researcher to endorse the thesis is Stuart J. Russell, but many others, like Roman Yampolskiy and Alexey Turchin, also support the basic thesis of a potential threat to humanity. Endorsers of the thesis sometimes express bafflement at skeptics: Gates states he does not "understand why some people are not concerned", and Hawking criticized widespread indifference in his 2014 editorial: 

A 2021 systematic review of the risks associated with AGI conducted by researchers from the Centre for Human Factors and Sociotechnical Systems of the University of the Sunshine Coast in Australia, while noting the paucity of data, found the following potential threats: "AGI removing itself from the control of human owners/managers, being given or developing unsafe goals, development of unsafe AGI, AGIs with poor ethics, morals and values; inadequate management of AGI, and existential risks".

Many of the scholars who are concerned about existential risk believe that the best way forward would be to conduct (possibly massive) research into solving the difficult "control problem" to answer the question: what types of safeguards, algorithms, or architectures can programmers implement to maximise the probability that their recursively-improving AI would continue to behave in a friendly, rather than destructive, manner after it reaches superintelligence? Solving the control problem is complicated by the AI arms race, which will almost certainly see the militarization and weaponization of AGI by more than one nation-state, i.e., resulting in AGI-enabled warfare, and in the case of AI misalignment, AGI-directed warfare, potentially against all humanity.

The thesis that AI can pose existential risk also has many strong detractors. Skeptics sometimes charge that the thesis is crypto-religious, with an irrational belief in the possibility of superintelligence replacing an irrational belief in an omnipotent God; at an extreme, Jaron Lanier argues that the whole concept that current machines are in any way intelligent is "an illusion" and a "stupendous con" by the wealthy.

Much of existing criticism argues that AGI is unlikely in the short term. Computer scientist Gordon Bell argues that the human race will destroy itself before it reaches the technological singularity. Gordon Moore, the original proponent of Moore's Law, declares that "I am a skeptic. I don't believe [a technological singularity] is likely to happen, at least for a long time. And I don't know why I feel that way." Former Baidu Vice President and Chief Scientist Andrew Ng states AI existential risk is "like worrying about overpopulation on Mars when we have not even set foot on the planet yet."

See also

 
 
 
 
 
 
 
 
 
 
  (IA)

Notes

References

Sources

 
 
 
 
 
 .
 
 .
 .
 
 
 
 .
 
 
 .
 
 
 
 
 
 .
 
 
 
 
 .
 
 
 
 
 
 
 
 
 
 
 .
 .
 
 .
 .
 .
 .

External links
 The AGI portal maintained by Pei Wang
 The Genesis Group at MIT's CSAIL – Modern research on the computations that underlay human intelligence
 OpenCog – open source project to develop a human-level AI
 Simulating logical human thought
 What Do We Know about AI Timelines? – Literature review

Hypothetical technology
Artificial intelligence
Computational neuroscience

fr:Intelligence artificielle#Intelligence artificielle forte